Robert, Bob or Bobby Robertson may refer to:

Arts and entertainment
 Robert Robertson (actor) (1930–2001), Scottish actor and director
 Bob Robertson (comedian), Canadian radio and television comedian
 Robert Robertson (singer), Scottish singer with Skipinnish and with Tide Lines

Politicians
 Robert Gordon Robertson (1917–2013), Canadian politician
 Robert Robertson (Nova Scotia politician) (1817–1901), Canadian politician
 Robert Chisholm Robertson (1861–1930), Scottish political activist
 Robert Robertson (Australian politician) (1887–1960)

Sciences
 Howard P. "Bob" Robertson (1903–1961), American mathematician and physicist
 R. G. Hamish Robertson (born 1943), Canadian physicist
 Robert Alexander Robertson (1873–1935), Scottish botanist
 Robert H. S. Robertson (1911–1999), Scottish chemist and mineralogist
 Robert Robertson (chemist) (1869–1949), Scottish chemist
 Robert Robertson (physician) (1742–1829), British physician, Fellow of the Royal Society

Sports
 Bob Robertson (born 1946), baseball player
 Bobby Robertson (1917–2009), American football player
 Robert Robertson (field hockey) (born 1938), Rhodesian Olympic hockey player
 Robert Robertson (footballer) (fl. 1900s), Scottish footballer (St Mirren)
 Robert Robertson (rugby union), Scottish  rugby union player

Other
 R. H. Robertson (1849–1919), American architect
 Robert Robertson (Home and Away), a fictional character from Home and Away
 Robert S. Robertson (1839–1906), U.S. Army soldier and Medal of Honor recipient

See also
Robertson (surname)
Robbie Robertson (disambiguation)